Colmar (German during 1871–1918 and 1940–1945) is a city and commune in the Haut-Rhin department and Grand Est region of north-eastern France. The third-largest commune in Alsace (after Strasbourg and Mulhouse), it is the seat of the prefecture of the Haut-Rhin department and of the subprefecture of the Colmar-Ribeauvillé arrondissement.

The city is renowned for its well-preserved old town, its numerous architectural landmarks, and its museums, among which is the Unterlinden Museum, which houses the Isenheim Altarpiece.

Colmar is situated on the Alsatian Wine Route and considers itself to be the "capital of Alsatian wine".

History

Colmar was first mentioned by Charlemagne in his chronicle about Saxon wars. This was the location where the Carolingian Emperor Charles the Fat held a diet in 884. Colmar was granted the status of a free imperial city by Emperor Frederick II in 1226. In 1354 it joined the Décapole city league. The city adopted the Protestant Reformation in 1575, long after the northern neighbours of Strasbourg and Sélestat. During the Thirty Years' War, it was taken by the Swedish army in 1632, which held it for two years. In 1634, the Schoeman family arrived and started the first town library. In 1635, the city's harvest was spoiled by Imperialist forces while the residents shot at them from the walls.

The city was conquered by France under King Louis XIV in 1673 and officially ceded by the 1679 Treaties of Nijmegen. In 1854 a cholera epidemic killed many in the city. With the rest of Alsace, Colmar was annexed by the newly formed German Empire in 1871 as a result of the Franco-Prussian War and incorporated into the Alsace-Lorraine province. It returned to France after World War I according to the 1919 Treaty of Versailles, was annexed by Nazi Germany in 1940, and then reverted to French control after the battle of the "Colmar Pocket" in 1945. Colmar has been continuously governed by conservative parties since 1947, the Popular Republican Movement (1947–1977), the Union for French Democracy (1977–1995) and the Union for a Popular Movement (since 1995), and has had only three mayors during that time.

The Colmar Treasure, a hoard of precious objects hidden by Jews during the Black Death, was discovered here in 1863.

Geography
It is located directly to the east of the Vosges and connected to the Rhine in the east by a canal.

In 2017, the city had a municipal population of 69,105, and the metropolitan area of Colmar had a population of 199,234 in 2018. Colmar is the center of the arrondissement of Colmar-Ribeauvillé, which had 211,312 inhabitants in 2017.

Climate

Colmar features an oceanic climate (Köppen: Cfb), but the latter is significantly modified by the city's far inland position with cold, dry winters and warm to hot, wetter summers.

The city has a sunny microclimate and is one of the driest cities in France, with an annual precipitation of just , making it ideal for Alsace wine. It is considered the capital of the Alsatian wine region.

The dryness results from the town's location next to mountains, which force clouds arriving from the west to rise, and much of their moisture to condense and fall as precipitation over the higher ground, leaving the air warmed and dried by the time it reaches Colmar.

The city is therefore closer to a continental climate and winter and summer temperatures can sometimes be the coldest or hottest in France.

Population

Main sights

Mostly spared from the destructions of the French Revolution and the wars of 1870–1871, 1914–1918 and 1939–1945, the cityscape of old-town Colmar is homogenous and renowned among tourists. An area that is crossed by canals of the river Lauch (which formerly served as the butcher's, tanner's and fishmonger's quarter) is now called "little Venice".

Architectural landmarks

Colmar's secular and religious architectural landmarks reflect eight centuries of Germanic and French architecture and the adaptation of their respective stylistic language to the local customs and building materials (pink and yellow Vosges sandstone, timber framing).

Secular buildings
Maison Adolph – 14th century (German Gothic)
Koïfhus, also known as Ancienne Douane – 1480 (German Gothic)
Maison Pfister – 1537 (German Renaissance).
Ancien Corps de garde – 1575 (German Renaissance)
Maison des Chevaliers de Saint-Jean – 1608 (German Renaissance)
Maison des Têtes – 1609 (German Renaissance)
Poêle des laboureurs – 1626 (German Baroque)
Ancien Hôpital – 1736–1744 (French Classicism)
Tribunal de grande instance – 1771 (French Classicism)
Hôtel de ville – 1790 (French Classicism)
Colmar prison – 1791, formerly a convent built in 1316.
Cour d'Assises – 1840 (French Neoclassicism)
Théâtre municipal – 1849 (French Neoclassicism)
Marché couvert – 1865 (French Neo-Baroque). The city's covered market, built in stone, bricks and cast iron, still serves today.
Préfecture – 1866 (French Neo-Baroque)
Water tower – 1886. Oldest still preserved water tower in Alsace. Out of use since 1984.
Gare SNCF – 1905 (German Neo-Baroque)
Cour d'appel – 1906 (German Neo-Baroque)

Religious buildings
  – 1234–1365. The largest church of Colmar and one of the largest in Haut-Rhin. Displays some early stained glass windows, several Gothic and Renaissance sculptures and altars, a grand Baroque organ case. The choir is surrounded by an ambulatory opening on a series of Gothic chapels, a unique feature in Alsatian churches.
  – 1289–1364. Now disaffected as a church, displays Martin Schongauer's masterwork La Vierge au buisson de roses as well as 14th century stained glass windows and baroque choir stalls. The adjacent convent buildings house a section of the municipal library.
  – 13th century. Gothic and Renaissance stained glass windows and mural paintings, as well as a wooden and painted ceiling.
  – 13th century. Disaffected church and convent buildings notable for a richly ornate cloister. Now housing the Unterlinden Museum (see below).
  – 1371. Disaffected church and convent buildings now used as an assembly hall and festival venue.
  – 1742–1750. Classicist chapel of a former Jesuit college.
 Synagogue – 1843 (Neoclassicism)

Fountains
  – 1864 (Statue by Bartholdi)
  – 1888 (Statue by Bartholdi)
  – 1898 (Statue by Bartholdi)

Monuments
  – 1856 (first shown 1855 in Paris. Statue by Bartholdi, his earliest major work)
  – 1894 (Statue by Bartholdi)
 Statue  − 1902 (in the courtyard of the Bartholdi Museum)
 Statue of Liberty (Liberty Enlightening the World) replica

Museums

 Unterlinden Museum – one of the main museums in Alsace. Displays the Isenheim Altarpiece, a large collection of medieval, Renaissance and baroque Upper-Rhenish paintings and sculptures, archaeological artefacts, design and international modern art.
 Musée Bartholdi – the birthplace of Frédéric Auguste Bartholdi shows his life and work through paintings, drawings, family objects and furniture as well as numerous plaster, metal and stone sculptures. A section of the museum is further dedicated to the local Jewish community's heritage.
  – the zoological and ethnographic museum of Colmar was founded in 1859. Besides a large collection of taxidermied animals, and artefacts from former French and German colonies in Africa and Polynesia, it also houses a collection of ancient Egyptian items.
  – the town's toy museum, founded 1993.
  – industrial and technological museum in a former factory, dedicated to the history of everyday technology.

Library
The Municipal Library of Colmar owns one of the richest collections of incunabula in France, with more than 2,300 volumes. This is quite an exceptional number for a city that is neither the main seat of a university, nor of a college, and has its explanation in the dissolution of local monasteries, abbeys and convents during the French Revolution and the subsequent gift of their collections to the town.

Transport
The small regional Colmar Airport serves Colmar.

The railway station Gare de Colmar offers connections to Strasbourg, Mulhouse, Besançon, Zürich and several regional destinations. Colmar was also once linked to Freiburg im Breisgau, in Germany and on the other side of the Rhine, by the Freiburg–Colmar international railway. However the railway bridge over the Rhine between Breisach and Neuf-Brisach was destroyed in 1945 and never replaced.

Education

Senior high schools in Colmar include:

Lycée Camille Sée
Lycée polyvalent Blaise Pascal
Lycée polyvalent Martin Schongauer
Lycée privé Saint-André
Lycée professionnel privé Saint-Jean
École privée Mathias Grunewald

The École Compleméntaire Pour L'Enseignement Japonaise à Colmar (コルマール補習授業校 Korumāru Hoshū Jugyō Kō), a part-time supplementary Japanese school, is held in Colmar. At one time classes were held at the Centre Cultural de Seijo.

Music
Since 1980, Colmar is home to an international summer festival of classical music  (also known as ). In its first version (1980 to 1989), it was placed under the artistic direction of the German conductor Karl Münchinger. Since 1989, it is helmed by the Russian violinist and conductor Vladimir Spivakov.

Economy

Colmar is an affluent city whose primary economic strength lies in the flourishing tourist industry. But it is also the seat of several large companies: Timken (European seat), Liebherr (French seat), Leitz (French seat), Capsugel France (A division of Pfizer).

Every year since 1947, Colmar is host to what is now considered as the biggest annual commercial event as well as the largest festival in Alsace, the Foire aux vins d'Alsace (Alsacian wine fair).

When Air Alsace existed, its head office was on the grounds of Colmar Airport.

Parks and recreation
By 1991 Lycée Seijo, a Japanese boarding high school in Kientzheim, had established a Japanese cultural center. It housed books and printed materials in Japan and hosted lectures and film screenings.

Notable people

 Caspar Isenmann (1410? – 1484?), painter
 Martin Schongauer (1450–1491), painter and engraver
 Georg Wickram (1502–1562), poet and novelist
 Jean-François Rewbell (1747–1807), diplomat and revolutionist
 Jean Rapp (1771–1821), lieutenant general
 Conrad Berg (1785–1852), composer
 Charles Xavier Thomas (1785–1870), inventor
 Marie Bigot (1786–1820), musician, pianist and composer, friend of Haydn and Beethoven
 Armand Joseph Bruat (1796–1855), admiral
 Georges-Charles de Heeckeren d'Anthès (1812–1895), politician, killer of Alexander Pushkin in a duel
 Auguste Nefftzer (1820–1876), journalist
 Frédéric Auguste Bartholdi (1834–1904), sculptor. He created Liberty Enlightening the World (the Statue of Liberty).
 Camille Sée, (1847–1919), politician
 Jean-Baptiste Lemire (1867–1945), composer
 Jean-Jacques Waltz (1873–1951), drawer and caricaturist
 Ernst Stadler (1883–1914), Alsatian poet
 Paul Wormser (1905–1944), Olympic epee fencer
 Hans Loewald (1906–1993), psychoanalyst and theorist
 Jean-Pierre Muller (1924–2008), Olympic epee fencer
 Bernard Schmitt (economist) (1929–2014), economist and founder of the "Quantum Economics"
 Guy Roux (born 1938), football coach
 Pierre Moerlen (1952–2005), musician, drummer and composer
 Pierre Hermé (born 1961), confectioner, entrepreneur and pastry chef
 Thomas Bloch (born 1962), musician
 Éric Straumann (born 1964), politician
 Pascal Elbé (born 1967), actor, director and screenwriter
 Marc Keller (born 1968), football player
 Cendrine Wolf (born 1969), children's author
 Pascal Johansen (born 1979), football player
 Amaury Bischoff (born 1987), football player
 Fabien Schmidt (born 1989), professional cyclist
 Ryad Boudebouz (born 1990), Algerian-French footballer

International relations

Twin towns – sister cities

Colmar is twinned with:

 Schongau, Bavaria, Germany (1962)
 Lucca, Italy (1962)
 Princeton, United States (1986)
 Győr, Hungary (1993)
 Sint-Niklaas, Belgium (1962)
 Vale of White Horse, England, United Kingdom (1978)
 Eisenstadt, Austria (1983)

Replicas of historical buildings in Malaysia
Bukit Tinggi Resort Colmar Tropicale which is situated in Bentong district, State of Pahang, Malaysia is a resort-theme historical village inspires from the original Colmar commune in France. Colmar Tropicale located 60 km north-east of Kuala Lumpur.

North of it, a rebuild of Château du Haut-Kœnigsbourg is in the Berjaya Hills, hosting an organic resort hotel.

In popular culture
Colmar's cityscape (and that of neighbouring Riquewihr) served as inspiration for the design of the Japanese animated film Howl's Moving Castle. Scenes in the anime Is the Order a Rabbit? are also based on this location.

See also

 List of mayors of Colmar

References

External links

 Official website of the city of Colmar
 Wine domain of the city of Colmar
 Tourist office of Colmar
 Colmar Music Festival

 
Communes of Haut-Rhin
Décapole
Free imperial cities
Populated places established in the 9th century
Prefectures in France